Sport Club Corinthians Paulista is a Brazilian multisport club based in Tatuapé, a bairro in the city of São Paulo. Although they compete in a number of different sports, Corinthians is mostly known for its association football team. The club was formed in Bom Retiro in 1910 as a homage to Corinthian Football Club, an English football club based in London. Corinthians played their first competitive match on March 23, 1913, when they entered the 1913 Campeonato Paulista, commonly referred to as the Paulistão.

The club has won a total of 44 major trophies, including the Brasileirão a six times, the Paulistão a record 27 times, the Copa do Brasil three times, the Torneio Rio – São Paulo a joint-record five times (including four shared titles), the Supercopa do Brasil once (being one of two clubs to ever win it), the Copa Libertadores once and the FIFA Club World Cup twice. Corinthians is the only club to have won the Copa Libertadores undefeated in the current format. It is also the only club with a flawless record at the FIFA Club World Cup managing to win both occasions it participated in.

This list details the club's achievements in major competitions, and the top scorers for each season.

Key

Key to league:
 Pos. = Final position
 Pl. = Played
 W = Games won
 D = Games drawn
 L = Games lost
 GF = Goals scored
 GA = Goals against
 Pts = Points

Key to rounds:
 C = Champion
 F = Final (Runner-up)
 SF = Semi-finals
 QF = Quarter-finals
 R16/R32 = Round of 16, round of 32, etc.
 3R/4R = Third round, fourth round, etc.
 GS = Group stage
 FS/SS/TS = First stage, second stage, third stage.

Seasons

Campeonato Brasileiro era

External links 
 Full list of all seasons 

Sport Club Corinthians Paulista seasons
Corinthians